Dâmina de Carvalho Pereira (born 2 December 1952) is a Brazilian politician and businesswoman. She has spent her political career representing Minas Gerais, having served as federal deputy representative from 2015 to 2019.

Personal life
Pereira was born to Joao Pereira de Carvalho and Waldette Rodrigues de Carvalho. Before becoming a politician Pereira worked as a businesswoman.

Political career
Pereira voted in favor of the impeachment of then-president Dilma Rousseff. She voted in favor of 2015 tax reforms but against the 2017 Brazilian labor reform, and would vote against the opening of a corruption investigation into Rousseff's successor Michel Temer.

Pereira is the first women to be elected to the chamber of deputies from the municipality of Lavras. Originally elected as a member of the Party of National Mobilization, Pereira joined the Party of the Brazilian Woman in 2015, then the Social Liberal Party the following year. In 2018 she joined Podemos.

References 

1952 births
Living people
People from Lavras
Brazilian businesspeople
Podemos (Brazil) politicians
Social Liberal Party (Brazil) politicians
Party of National Mobilization politicians
Members of the Chamber of Deputies (Brazil) from Minas Gerais
Brazilian women in politics